Il feudatario is a comedy play by Venetian playwright Carlo Goldoni. It was published in 1752.

Plays by Carlo Goldoni
1752 plays